Sir Christopher Sykes, 2nd Baronet (23 May 1749 – 17 September 1801) was an English Tory politician and a Member of Parliament (MP) for Beverley from 1784 to 1790.

He was the only son of Reverend Sir Mark Sykes, 1st Baronet, minister of Roos in the East Riding of Yorkshire, who had created the Sykes Baronets shortly before his death in 1783. On his father's death Sir Christopher inherited Sledmere House.

In the 1790s he greatly improved the house and expanded the estate He bought and enclosed huge areas of land for cultivation, built two new wings to the house, and landscaped the grounds, planting 10 square kilometres of trees. Sir Christopher left a vast estate of nearly 120 square kilometres and a large mansion set in its own 0.8 square kilometres of parkland, which survives in the family to the present day. Sir Christopher also employed Joseph Rose, the most celebrated plasterer of his day, to decorate Sledmere.

He was elected at the 1784 general election as one of the two MPs for the borough of Beverley, but did not stand again at the 1790 election.

Christopher Sykes married Elizabeth, daughter of William Tatton of Wythenshawe Hall in Cheshire, with whom he had three sons and two daughters. He was succeeded in turn by his sons Sir Mark Masterman-Sykes, 3rd Baronet and Sir Tatton Sykes, 4th Baronet. His daughter Elizabeth married her cousin Wilbraham Egerton of Tatton Park.

See also
 Sykes family of Sledmere

References

1749 births
1801 deaths
British MPs 1784–1790
Members of the Parliament of Great Britain for English constituencies
Baronets in the Baronetage of Great Britain